L'Entente Provencale de Manosque is a French football club based in Manosque, Alpes-de-Haute-Provence. It was founded in 1925. The club currently plays in the Championnat de France Amateurs 2, the fifth tier of the French football league system, after being relegated from the Championnat de France Amateurs in the 2007-08 season.

Honours
Champions DH Méditerranée : 1999
Winner of the Coupe de Provence : 1978

External links
Official site

Association football clubs established in 1925
1925 establishments in France
Sport in Alpes-de-Haute-Provence
Football clubs in Provence-Alpes-Côte d'Azur